The Munroe Building is a historic commercial building at 1227-1259 Hancock Street in Quincy, Massachusetts.  Built in 1929 to a design by Shepard & Stearns, it is the best-preserved of two adjacent Colonial Revival two-story commercial blocks built on Hancock Street in the 1920s.  The building was listed on the National Register of Historic Places in 1989.

Description and history
The Munroe Building is set on the southwest side of Hancock Street in downtown Quincy, between the street and the Quincy Center MBTA station.  To its southeast is a public park, with Quincy City Hall at the far end.  It is a rectangular two-story structure, faced in brick with stone trim.  The street and park-facing facades are similar, with commercial storefronts on the ground floor that are predominantly 1980s vintage glass and aluminum.  The upper level is characterized by a series of gables, each of which has a central window topped by a blind round arch, and flanking sash windows, in a variant of the Palladian window concept.  The central window is surrounded by a garland.  Between the gable sections are smaller sections with single sash windows that have blind segmented-arch tops.

The Colonial Revival building was designed by Shepard and Stearns and built in 1929.  Then, as now, it housed retail stores on the ground floor and professional offices above.  It was built by Henry Faxon, a major real estate owner of the period.  The Dimmock Building, a block down Hancock Street, is another Colonial Revival building from 1929; it has been substantially altered.

See also
National Register of Historic Places listings in Quincy, Massachusetts

References

Commercial buildings on the National Register of Historic Places in Massachusetts
Colonial Revival architecture in Massachusetts
Buildings and structures completed in 1929
Buildings and structures in Quincy, Massachusetts
National Register of Historic Places in Quincy, Massachusetts